Andrew "Andy" Hogg (birth unknown) was a Scottish professional rugby league footballer who played in the 1890s, 1900s and 1910s.

Hogg is one of only two people born in Scotland to have played for the England national rugby league team, the other being George Fairbairn.

Career
Hogg played for Broughton Rangers, appearing 339 times and scoring 186 tries between 1899 and 1910.

Hogg was signed by Wigan at the start of the 1910–11 season, but made only seven appearances before moving to Barrow in February 1911.

Hogg won cap(s) for Other Nationalities while at Broughton Rangers in ? against England, won caps for England while at Broughton Rangers in 1908 against Wales, and New Zealand, and won a cap for Great Britain while at Broughton Rangers in 1908 against New Zealand.

References

External links
Search for "Andrew Hogg" at britishnewspaperarchive.co.uk
Search for "Drew Hogg" at britishnewspaperarchive.co.uk
Search for "Andy Hogg" at britishnewspaperarchive.co.uk

Barrow Raiders players
Broughton Rangers players
England national rugby league team players
Great Britain national rugby league team players
Lancashire rugby league team players
Other Nationalities rugby league team players
Place of birth missing
Place of death missing
Rugby league wingers
Scottish rugby league players
Wigan Warriors players
Year of birth missing
Year of death missing